Super Cobra is a horizontally scrolling shooter developed by Konami, originally released as an arcade video game in 1981. It was published by Konami in Japan in March 1981 and manufactured and distributed by Stern in North America on June 22. It is the spiritual sequel to the Scramble arcade game released earlier in 1981. Super Cobra contains eleven distinct sections, versus six in Scramble,  and is significantly more difficult, requiring maneuvering through tight spaces early in the game.

The game was a commercial success, selling 12,337 arcade cabinets in the United States within four months, becoming Stern's third best-selling arcade game. Super Cobra was widely ported by Parker Brothers, and there are Adventure Vision and standalone versions from Entex.

Gameplay
The player controls a helicopter through tight caverns, and the slightest misstep will result in the loss of a life. However, unlike Scramble, the game can be continued where the player left off by adding more credits and pressing FIRE (but he/she loses all points upon continuing).

The joystick accelerates, decelerates, moves up, and moves down. The helicopter uses a laser and bomb to destroy defenders, tanks, and UFOs while infiltrating 10 Super Cobra defense systems.

The ship has a limited fuel supply, which is depleted over time. More fuel can be acquired by destroying fuel tanks in the game.

The game is divided into ten sections, plus a finale, each with a different style of terrain and different obstacles. Players navigate through ten levels and a base, where they must safely make it through the level and remove the booty. The levels are described as follows:

 Player must maneuver the chopper over mountainous terrain against fast and slow firing rockets.
 Chopper faces Arcing missiles over a mountain terrain.
 Smart Bombs flying in groups of four over mountainous terrain. Rockets appear, but do not fire.
 Single Smart Bombs over mountainous terrain. Again, Rockets appear, but do not fire.
 Chopper flies through a cavern-like terrain against falling mines.
 Rapidly firing, roving tanks over mountainous terrain. Rockets appear, but do not fire.
 Maneuver through a field of meteors which explode when hit with bombs or 3 times with laser, plus a single, green, shadow meteor directly in front of chopper which explodes when hit five times with laser. Rockets appear but do not fire.
 Chopper flies over mountainous terrain against rapidly firing UFOs. Tanks and rockets appear, but do not fire.
 Chopper faces arcing missiles over tall buildings.
 Firing rockets in a building maze.
 Base: Player must maneuver the chopper over tall buildings against arcing missiles and rapidly firing tanks to reach the Booty and safely carry it away. If the mission is successful, an extra copter is given (plus one when 10,000 points are scored).

There is no intermission between each section; the game simply scrolls into the new terrain. If the player destroys the booty on the final level, he/she must start back at the beginning of the level.

If the booty is safely carried away, the player starts back at the beginning of the first level and the cycle repeats.  On the second time through the levels, the tanks fire much more aggressively and fuel is consumed much faster. On the third and subsequent times through the levels, fuel is consumed still faster. The faster rate of fuel consumption on the second and subsequent cycles may make it difficult to complete those cycles without losing at least one chopper due to running out of fuel, although this is compensated somewhat by awarding an extra chopper each time a cycle is completed and the booty is carried away.

Ports
The game was ported to the Atari 2600, Atari 5200, ColecoVision, Intellivision, Odyssey², and Atari 8-bit family by Parker Brothers. It was also released for Sord M5, MSX, Entex Adventure Vision and Casio PV-1000. Entex produced a standalone tabletop version.

Reception

The game was a commercial success, selling 12,337 arcade cabinets in the United States within four months, by October 2, 1981, becoming Stern's third best-selling arcade classic after Berzerk and Scramble. Scramble sold 15,136 cabinets in the U.S. in five months earlier that year, adding up to 27,473 U.S. cabinet sales for both.

Arcade Express in November 1982 gave the Adventure Vision port a score of 9 out of 10. They concluded that it "takes real skill to master, and represents the state-of-the-art of scrolling shoot-outs".

The Atari 2600 version was awarded a Certificate of Merit in the category of "Best Action Videogame" at the 5th annual Arkie Awards for 1983. They compared it to Vanguard and said it "provides the same brand of relentless, multi-scenario action".

Legacy
Super Cobra appeared alongside Scramble on the retro compilation Konami Arcade Classics, released for the Sony PlayStation in 1999.

See also
Cosmic Avenger
Vanguard

Notes

References

External links

Super Cobra at the Arcade History database
Super Cobra for the Atari 8-bit family at Atari Mania
 (Atari 8-bit port)

1981 video games
Adventure Vision games
Arcade video games
Atari 2600 games
Atari 5200 games
Atari 8-bit family games
ColecoVision games
Handheld electronic games
Helicopter video games
Horizontally scrolling shooters
Intellivision games
Konami games
MSX games
Parker Brothers video games
Stern video games
Magnavox Odyssey 2 games
Konami arcade games
Video games developed in Japan